The year 1894 in art involved some significant events.

Events
 February – Oscar Wilde's play Salome is first published in English, with illustrations by Aubrey Beardsley.
 April – The Yellow Book (edited by Henry Harland with Aubrey Beardsley as art editor) begins publication by John Lane and Elkin Mathews – The Bodley Head in London.
 June 5 – Opening of Racławice Panorama in Lwów.
 August 23 – Jack Butler Yeats marries fellow artist Mary Cottenham White.
 The Della Robbia Pottery is established as part of the Arts and Crafts movement by Harold Rathbone and Conrad Dressler in Birkenhead, England.
 Lucien Pissarro sets up the Eragny Press in England.
 Bernard Berenson publishes The Venetian Painters of the Renaissance, with an Index to their Works.

Awards

Works

 Lawrence Alma-Tadema – Spring (Getty Museum, Los Angeles)
 Charles Burton Barber
 Queen Victoria with John Brown
 Suspense
 Aubrey Beardsley
 Self-portrait in bed (line block print)
 Illustrations to Oscar Wilde's Salome
 Olga Boznańska – Girl with Chrysanthemums
 Edward Burne-Jones
 Love Among the Ruins (copy in oils)
 (with John Henry Dearle and William Morris) – Holy Grail tapestries (original versions completed)
 Gustave Caillebotte – The garden of the Petit Gennevilliers in winter
 Gustaf Cederström – Among the Homeless
 Paul Cézanne – Rideau, Cruchon et Compotier
 Herbert Dicksee – Silent Sympathy
 Árpád Feszty – Arrival of the Hungarians (cyclorama)
 Paul Gauguin
 Breton Peasants (Musée d'Orsay, Paris)
 Oviri (ceramic sculpture, original cast in Musée d'Orsay)
 J. W. Godward – A Priestess
 Thomas Cooper Gotch – The Child Enthroned
 Paja Jovanović – The Takovo Uprising
 Max Liebermann – Der Garten des Waisenhauses in Amsterdam
 Maximilien Luce – Port of London, Night
 Frederick William MacMonnies – Bacchante and Infant Faun (bronze, Metropolitan Museum of Art, New York City)
 Jacek Malczewski – Melancholia
 Henri Matisse – Woman Reading
 Claude Monet – Rouen Cathedral (The Portal, Morning Sun; Harmony in Blue) (Musée d'Orsay, Paris)
 Edvard Munch
 Anxiety (Munch Museum, Oslo)
 Puberty (National Gallery, Oslo)
 Love and Pain (Vampire) (Gothenburg Museum of Art, Sweden)
 Ernest Normand – The White Slave
 Władysław Podkowiński – Ecstasy
 Henrietta Rae – Psyche at the Throne of Venus
 Tom Roberts – The Golden Fleece
 Georges Rochegrosse – The Knight of the Flowers (Parsifal) (Musée d'Orsay, Paris)
 Aleksander Sochaczewski – Farewell Europe!
 Solomon Joseph Solomon – Mrs Patrick Campbell as Paula Tanqueray
 Marie Spartali Stillman
 Love Sonnets
 A Rose from Armida's Garden
 Henry Ossawa Tanner – The Thankful Poor
 James Tissot
 The Adoration of the Shepherds
 What Our Lord Saw from the Cross
 Henri de Toulouse-Lautrec – Woman Pulling Up Her Stocking (Musée d'Orsay, Paris)
 Ferdinand Freiherr von Miller – J. Marion Sims (bronze)
 Fritz von Uhde – Noli me tangere
 Theodoor Verstraete – Spring in Schoore (Zeeland)
 Stanisław Wyspiański – Planty Park at Dawn

Births
 9 January – Reg Gammon, English painter and illustrator (died 1997)
 8 March – Wäinö Aaltonen, Finnish sculptor (died 1966)
 17 March – Meredith Frampton, English portrait painter (died 1984)
 10 April – Ben Nicholson, English abstract painter (died 1982)
 19 April – Adolf Wissel, German painter, an official artist of Nazism (died 1973)
 22 April – Evie Hone, Irish painter and stained glass artist (died 1955)
 27 April – George Petty, American pin-up artist (died 1975)
 17 May – Zora Petrović, one of the most significant representatives of Expressionism of color in Serbian art between two wars (died 1962)
 6 June – Arthur Szyk, Polish-born illustrator and political artist (died 1951)
 13 June – Jacques Henri Lartigue, French photographer and painter (died 1986)
 28 June – Ronald Ossory Dunlop, Irish author and painter (died 1973)
 2 July – André Kertész, Hungarian-born photographer (died 1985)
 14 July – Dave Fleischer, Austrian-American animator, film director, and film producer (died 1979)
 26 August – Gala Dalí, model and wife of Salvador Dalí (died 1982)
 3 September – André Hébuterne, French painter (died 1992)
 7 October – Doris Huestis Speirs, Canadian painter, ornithologist and poet (died 1989)
 8 October – Risto Stijović, Serbian sculptor (died 1974)
 14 October – E. E. Cummings, American poet and painter (died 1962)
 4 November – Chafik Charobim, Egyptian painter (died 1975)
 8 November – Norman Rockwell, American painter and illustrator (died 1978)
 8 December – James Thurber, American cartoonist (died 1961)
 27 December – Annot, German painter (died 1981)
 date unknown
 Bror Hjorth, Swedish sculptor and painter (died 1968)
 Ovartaci, born Louis Marcussen, Danish outsider artist (died 1985)

Deaths
 January 3 – Gustav Fabergé, German jeweler (born 1814)
 January 10 – Carl Werner, German watercolour painter (born 1808)
 January 29 – Armand Gautier, French painter (born 1825)
 February 13 – Georg Decker, Austro-Hungarian portrait painter (born 1818)
 February 21 – Gustave Caillebotte, French painter and arts patron (born 1848)
 April 12 – Lucy Madox Brown, English painter (born 1843)
 April 27 – Charles Laval, French painter (born 1862)
 June 17 – William Hart, Scottish American landscape painter (born 1823)
 July 1 – Jean-Joseph Carriès, French sculptor and ceramicist (born 1850)
 July 25 – Per Hasselberg, Swedish sculptor (born 1850)
 August 5 – Giovanni Muzzioli, Italian painter (born 1854)
 August 30 – Joseph Robinson Kirk, Irish sculptor (born 1821)
 September 26 – Launt Thompson, Irish sculptor (born 1833)
 date unknown – Charles Burton Barber, English genre painter (born 1845)

 
Years of the 19th century in art
1890s in art